The 10 μm process (10 micron smallest dimension) is the level of MOSFET semiconductor process technology that was commercially reached around 1971, by leading semiconductor companies such as RCA and Intel.

Products featuring 10 μm manufacturing process
 RCA's CD4000 series of integrated circuits began with a 20μm process in 1968, before gradually downscaling and eventually reaching 10μm in the next several years.
 Intel 1103, an early dynamic random-access memory (DRAM) chip launched in 1970, used an 8μm process.
 Intel 4004 CPU launched in 1971 was manufactured using a 10μm process. 
 Intel 8008 CPU launched in 1972 was manufactured using this process.

References

External links
Brief timeline of microprocessor development

10000
1971 introductions